Time To Fly was a Lithuanian aircraft manufacturer based in Kaunas. The company specialized in the design and manufacture of paramotors in the form of ready-to-fly aircraft for the US FAR 103 Ultralight Vehicles rules and the European microlight category.

The company was founded in 1997 and seems to have gone out of business in 2004. The company's early designs used mostly the  Solo 210 powerplant, while later models, like the Backplane SL, have more powerful engines, like the  Simonini Mini 2 Plus.

The company also produced the Radne Raket 120-powered Time To Fly Racket and the compact Time To Fly Scooter.

Aircraft

References

External links
Company website archives on Archive.org
Defunct aircraft manufacturers of Lithuania
Ultralight aircraft
Paramotors